Girls' Academy of Newark is a public all-girls' school in Newark, in Essex County, New Jersey, United States. The school, under Newark Public Schools, is located in the Louise A. Spencer School complex in Central Ward. The school, scheduled to become a grade 6-12 school, opened in 2013 with 75 sixth-grade students. It was the first public all-girls' school in New Jersey since Battin High School in Elizabeth, which merged into a boys' school in 1977.

See also
 Eagle Academy for Young Men of Newark - An all boys' school in Newark

References

External links
 

2013 establishments in New Jersey
Girls' schools in New Jersey
Education in Newark, New Jersey
Educational institutions established in 2013
Public high schools in New Jersey
Public middle schools in New Jersey